Marisela Hernandez (born April 24, 1966 as Marisela Esqueda), commonly known as Marisela, is a Mexican-American singer. In 1984, she recorded her first album at the age of 18, and continued to release albums into the 1990s. Her cover version of Barbara George's single "I Know (You Don't Love Me No More)", titled "Ya No", peaked at number-one in the Billboard Latin Songs chart in 1990.  As a child she starred in Villa Alegre.

Discography 

  (Released August 2, 2011 on iTunes)

 Tu cárcel
 Que lástima
 Tus mentiras
 Este Adiós
 El peor de mis fracasos
 Me volví a acordar de ti
 Navidad sin ti
 Tienes Razón
 Yo te necesito
 Y ahora te vas
 Dónde estás
(All songs written by Marco Antonio Solís)

 Noches eternas (2007)

 Noches eternas (Felipe Valdez Leal)
 Sola con mi soledad (Aníbal Pastor)
 Ya no te vayas (Marco Antonio Solís)
 Me gusta estar contigo (Juan Gabriel)
 Completamente tuya (Xavier Santos)
 Si no te hubieras ido (Marco Antonio Solís)
 No me hablen de él (Marisela Esqueda)
 Mi problema (Aníbal Pastor)
 No puedo olvidarlo (Marco Antonio Solís)
 Fue tan poco tu cariño (Juan Gabriel)
 Sin él (Marco Antonio Solís)
 Amor de los dos (Gilberto Parra)

 Éxitos con Banda (2005)

 Ámame (Xavier Santos)
 Adiós amor (Marisela Esqueda)
 Loca (Willie Nelson)
 Total (Ray Pardomo)
 Me desperté llorando (Leo Dan)
 Quizás mañana (Juan Gabriel)
 Nunca olvidaré (Marisela Esqueda)
 Piel canela (Bobby Capó)
 Amor tan mío (Víctor Yuñez Castillo)
 Ya lo pagaras (José Aguiñada)

 La otra (2002)

 Voy a quitarme el anillo (Rafael Ferro /Roberto Livi)
 La otra (Erica Ender/Alejandro Jaén)
 Te amo (Roberto Livi/ Rudy Pérez)
 El baúl de los recuerdos (Rafael Ferro /Roberto Livi)
 Hasta que te olvide (Rafael Ferro /Roberto Livi)
 Flechazo de Cupido (R. Esparza)
 Voy a comprar un CD (Roberto Livi/ Rudy Pérez)
 No me vas a matar (Virginia Faiad/ Miguel O. Iacopetti/Luis Sarmiento)
 No me lastima (Erica Ender/Alejandro Jaén)
 El amor de mis amores (Juan Marcelo)
 Y te voy a olvidar (Marco Flores)
 El amor de mi vida (Gustavo Avigliano/ F. Schiantarelli)
 Voy a quitarme el anillo (Banda) (Rafael Ferro /Roberto Livi)
 Historia de un amor – Boleros con trío (2000)

 Total (Ray Pardomo)
 Tus Mentiras (Paublo Ibarra)
 Piel canela (Bobby Capó)
 Desvelo de amor (Rafael Hernández Marín)
 Historia de un amor (Carlos Almarán)
 Tonto (Armando Manzanero)
 Cenizas (Wello Rivas)
 Tus promesas de amor (Miguel Amadeo)
 ¿De qué presumes? (Homero Aguilar)
 Ilusión perdida (D. A. R.)
 Quizás, quizás, quizás (Joe Davis/ Osvaldo Farrés)
 Somos diferentes (Ruiz/ Pablo Beltrán)

 En vivo Tu Dama de Hierro (1999)

 Intro
 Enamorada y herida (Xavier Santos)
 Cariño mío, amigo mío (Aníbal Pastor)
 Mi problema (Aníbal Pastor)
 Completamente tuya/Sola con mi soledad/Si alguna vez (Xavier Santos/ Aníbal Pastor/ Roberto Bellester)
 Tu dama de hierro (Aníbal Pastor)
 Porque tengo ganas (Aníbal Pastor)
 Y sé que vas a llorar (Carlos María)
 Sin él (Marco Antonio Solís)
 Vete con ella/Si no te hubieras ido/No puedo olvidarlo (Marco Antonio Solís)
 El chico aquel (Marco Antonio Solís)
 Un amor en el olvido (Víctor Franco)
 Muriendo de amor (Xavier Santos)
 Decídete (Marisela Esqueda)
 Ya lo pagarás (José Aguiñada)
 Y voy a ser feliz (Cortés, Xavier Santos)
 Ya no (Bárbara George)
 Voz y sentimiento (1997)

 Loca (Willie Nelson)
 Ya lo pagarás (José Aguiñada)
 Escríbeme (Marisela Esqueda)
 Vuelve (Blanca Estela Zurita)
 Vete con Dios (José Manuel Lozano)
 Y a poco no (Blanca Estela Zurita)
 Quizás mañana (Juan Gabriel)
 Por tus mentiras (Ángel Castelo/ Lenin García)
 Fácil es perdonar (E. Jr. Aguilar)
 Decídete (Marisela Esqueda)
 Crazy (Willie Nelson)

 Borrón y cuenta nueva (1995)

 Un amor en el olvido (Víctor Franco) (#21)
 Me olvidaré de ti (Adolfo Ángel Alba)
 Borrón y cuenta nueva (Elizardo "Chalo" Campos)
 Tú mi niña (Víctor Franco)
 Debo contar hasta diez (Orlando Gimenez/ O. Jiménez/ C. Nilson/ Dario Valles)
 ¿Qué pensabas? (Anselmo Solís)
 Que manera tan estúpida de amar (Víctor Franco)
 No vayas a volver jamás (Angel Castelo/ Gustavo Mendez)
 No me vas a convencer (Lolita de la Colina)
 Para nunca volver (Roberto Guardarrama)
 Marisela con la Banda la Escamilla (1993)

 Ya no te vayas (Marco Antonio Solís)
 Mi problema (Aníbal Pastor)
 Completamente tuya (Xavier Santos)
 Prefiero ir sola (Marco Antonio Solís)
 Ahora no (Xavier Santos)
 Siéntame, ámame, quiéreme (Xavier Santos)
 Sola con mi soledad (Aníbal Pastor)
 No puedo olvidarlo (Marco Antonio Solís)
 Vete mejor (Marco Antonio Solís)
 El chico aquel (Marco Antonio Solís)
 Adiós amor (1992)

 Ámame (Cortés, Xavier Santos)
 Adiós amor (Marisela Esqueda)
 Me desperté llorando (Leo Dan)
 Te devuelvo tu apellido (Eloy Monrouzeau) (#16)
 Porque amo la música (Adrián Posse)
 Nunca olvidaré (Marisela Esqueda)
 Tonto corazón (Marisela Esqueda)
 Amor tan mío (Víctor Yuñez Castillo)
 Ven, acércate un poco (Tommy Boyce/ Wes Farrel/ Bobby Hart)
 Si de mí te alejas (Kiko Campos/ Fernado Riba)
 Hablemos claro (1990)

 Y sé que vas a llorar (Carlos María) (#2)
 Tú y yo (A. Martines. M. A. Valenzuela)
 Cha-cha (Adele Bertei/ D. Bryant/ William Shelby)
 Vete de mí (Anselmo Solís)
 A partir de hoy (Álvaro Torres) (#7)
 Ya te olvidé (Anselmo Solís) (#14)
 Tu adeudo (Graciela Carballo/ Horacio Lanci)
 En Cancún (Enrique Elizondo/ Paul Gordon/ Jay Gruska)
 Hablemos claro (Aníbal Pastor)
 Amor de compra y venta (Jorge Luis Borrego)
 Marisela (1989)

 Amarte es genial (Graciela Carballo/Gilson/Joran) (#8)
 Y voy a ser feliz (Cortés, Xavier Santos) (#6)
 Ya no te quiero (Peter Bliss/ Graciela Carballo)
 O me quieres o me dejas (Roberto Bellester) (#38)
 Ámame un poco más (Cortés, Xavier Santos)
 Para volver a empezar (Graciela Carballo/Horacio Lanzi)
 Ya no puedo volver contigo (Anselmo Solís) (#5)
 Ya no (Bárbara George) (#1)
 Demasiado Tarde (Josè Antonio Sosa) (#9)
 Mi triste amiga (Cortés, Xavier Santos)
 Porque tengo ganas (1986) ARDC Music Division

 Tu dama de hierro (Aníbal Pastor) (#2)
 Porque tengo ganas (Aníbal Pastor) (#17)
 Yo sé que tú (Roberto Bellester)
 Quisiera detener el tiempo (Aníbal Pastor)
 A escondidas (Roberto Bellester)
 El fin de nuestro amor (Eusebio Cortés)
 Hazme tuya (Álvaro Torres) (#20)
 Arrepentida (Aníbal Pastor) (#24)
 Quédate a mi lado (Aníbal Pastor)
 Si alguna vez (Roberto Bellester)

 Completamente tuya (1985)

 Siénteme, ámame, quiéreme (Cortés, Xavier Santos)
 Así de fácil (Xavier Santos)
 Ahora no (Xavier Santos)
 Enamorada y herida (Xavier Santos)
 Mi problema (Aníbal Pastor) (#41)
 Completamente tuya (Xavier Santos)
 Muriendo de amor (Xavier Santos)
 Amigo mío, cariño mío (Aníbal Pastor)
 Sola con mi soledad (Aníbal Pastor)
 ¿A cambio de qué? (Xavier Santos)
 Sin el (1984)

 Ya no te vayas (Marco Antonio Solís)
 Vete mejor (Marco Antonio Solís)
 No puedo olvidarlo (Marco Antonio Solís)
 La pareja ideal (Marco Antonio Solís)
 El chico aquel (Marco Antonio Solís)
 Sin él (Marco Antonio Solís)
 Si no te hubieras ido (Marco Antonio Solís)
 Prefiero ir sola (Marco Antonio Solís)
 Dios bendiga nuestro amor (Marco Antonio Solís)
 Vete con ella (Marco Antonio Solís)

Compilation albums 

 Lo básico de Marisela (2010 incluye 4CD´S)
 Las Número 1 (CD+DVD)
 Tesoros de colección (2007)
 Ellas cantan así (2003)
 Serie 2000 (2000)
 Serie Platino (1996)
 20 éxitos inmortales
 30 grandes éxitos
 Personalidad
 La mejor intérprete de Marco Antonio Solís
 15 Éxitos Vol. 1
 15 Éxitos Vol. 2

References

External links
http://www.marisela.com.mx

Living people
1966 births
Mexican women singers
Women in Latin music